The women's 400 metres at the 2011 IPC Athletics World Championships is held at the QEII Stadium from 22–29 January

Medalists

References
Complete Results Book from the 2011 IPC Athletics World Championships
Official site of the 2011 IPC Athletics World Championships

400 metres
2011 in women's athletics
400 metres at the World Para Athletics Championships